Bremen High School is a public high school in Bremen, Georgia, United States. The school's mascot is the Blue Devil.

Controversies
In August 2019, a racist note was found in a student bathroom at the school. The message in the note included references to the racial discrimination that existed in the United States, most notably in the South. Many students at the school reported to local media outlets that the note was "just a part of a larger problem at the Georgia school." Administration officials later claimed after an investigation that the note was a result of a hoax aimed at shining a light on social issues within the school.

School replacement
In February 2021, the school administration announced plans to remove many of the halls that have stood for roughly 70 years, and construct a new state-of-the-art facility. The new building is expected to be completed within two years.

Notable alumni

Dean Mathis and Mark Mathis, of the pop trio, The Newbeats
Tom Murphy, politician
Jake Verity, place kicker for the Baltimore Ravens

References

External links
 

Public high schools in Georgia (U.S. state)
Schools in Haralson County, Georgia